Southport is a seaside town in Merseyside, England.

Southport or South Port may also refer to:

Australia
 Southport, Queensland, a Gold Coast suburb
 Town of Southport, a former local government area in Queensland
 Electoral district of Southport, Queensland, Australia
 Southport, Northern Territory, a suburb of Darwin
 Southport Island, Tasmania
 Southport, Tasmania

Canada
 Southport, Newfoundland and Labrador
 Portage la Prairie/Southport Airport

China
 South Port, Hainan

New Zealand
 Port Pegasus / Pikihatiti, formerly South Port, a site on Stewart Island, New Zealand
 South Port (New Zealand), a bay off Taiari / Chalky Inlet

United Kingdom
 Southport (UK Parliament constituency)

United States
 Southport, Connecticut, a section of Fairfield, Connecticut
 Southport Historic District (Fairfield, Connecticut)
 Southport, Florida
 Southport, Indiana, a city in Marion County
 Southport, Owen County, Indiana, an unincorporated community
 Southport, Maine
 Southport, New York, a town
 Southport (CDP), New York, a census-designated place in the town
 Southport Correctional Facility
 Southport, North Carolina
 Southport, Oregon
 Southport (Renton, Washington), a mixed-use development
 Kenosha, Wisconsin, formerly Southport

See also
 Southport station (disambiguation)